Suluca, also known as Komer, is a village of Muş District, Muş Province, eastern Turkey. Its population is 400 (2021).

Population
Known as Komer to the Armenians, Church records state that in 1890,there were 70 Armenian households in the town, and a second survey indicated there were 38 Kurdish households. By  1902 records show only 58 Armenian households and then in In 1910, church records recorded 60 Armenian households and a similar record in 1914.

References 

Villages in Muş District
Kurdish settlements in Turkey